Feng Yong (born 19 December 1985 in Henan), is a male Chinese Olympic racing cyclist, who competed for China at the 2008 Summer Olympics in the team sprint event.

Sports career
2002 Nanyang Sports School;
2004 Henan Provincial Cycling Team;
2005 National Team

Major performances
2005 National Games - 1st sprint/1 km individual time trial;
2006 Asian Games - 1st 1 km individual time trial/2nd team sprint;
2005/2006 World Cup Australia - 1st 1 km individual time trial;
2005/2006 World Championships - 6th 1 km individual time trial

Records
2005/2006 World Cup Australia 1 km individual time trial - 1;03.016 (NR);
2006/2007 World Cup Russia 200m - 10.281 (NR)

External links
 Profile Beijing 2008 Team China

1985 births
Living people
Chinese male cyclists
Cyclists at the 2008 Summer Olympics
Olympic cyclists of China
Cyclists from Henan
Asian Games medalists in cycling
Cyclists at the 2006 Asian Games
Cyclists at the 2010 Asian Games
Medalists at the 2006 Asian Games
Asian Games gold medalists for China
Asian Games silver medalists for China
21st-century Chinese people